Kak Kahzad Castle is a historical castle located in Dana County in Kohgiluyeh and Boyer-Ahmad Province, The fortress dates back to the Sasanian Empire.

References 

Castles in Iran
Sasanian castles